A Special Weather Statement (SAME event code SPS) is a form of weather advisory. Special Weather Statements are issued by the National Weather Service of the United States (the NWS) and the Meteorological Service of Canada (the MSC). There are no set criteria for special weather statements in either country.

United States

A Special Weather Statement may be issued by the NWS for hazards that have not yet reached warning or advisory status or that do not have a specific code of their own, such as widespread funnel clouds. They are also occasionally used to clear counties from severe weather watches. Occasionally, special weather statements appear as heat advisories. An EAS activation can and may be requested on very rare occasions.

Special Weather Statements may also be issued for possible fire weather conditions, such as an enhanced risk. Sometimes, Special Weather Statements may be issued to update on current weather conditions, but that is mostly issued by a Short Term Forecast.

Canada

Special Weather Statements are issued by the MSC for weather events that are unusual or those that cause general inconvenience or public concern and cannot adequately be described in a weather forecast. These may include widespread events such as Arctic outflows, Alberta clippers, coastal fog banks, areas of possible thunderstorm development, and strong winds such as chinooks and les suetes winds. They are written in a free style and may also reflect warnings in effect near the United States border.

See also
Severe weather terminology (United States)
Severe weather terminology (Canada)

References

External links
United States National Weather Service
Canadian Weather Warning Terminology

Statements
Weather warnings and advisories